Mar Shimun XII Yoalaha was the seventh Patriarch of the Chaldean Catholic Church, from 1656 to 1662.

He succeeded Patriarch Shimun XI Eshuyow, the seat of the patriarchate of Babylon of the Chaldean Catholic church being in Khosrau-Abad near Salmas, Safavid Empire during his reign.

Mar Shimun XII Yoalaha like his predecessors Shimun X Eliyah and Shimun XI Eshuyow was not formally recognized by Rome after the hereditary Shimun line of Patriarchs was reintroduced by  Patriarch Shimun IX Dinkha in the Chaldean church. Hereditary succession is an unacceptable practice in Catholic Church.

His successor in 1662 was Shimun XIII Dinkha, the last of the Shimun line in the Chaldean Church.

See also
 Patriarch of the Church of the East
 List of patriarchs of the Church of the East
 List of Chaldean Catholic patriarchs of Babylon

Chaldean Catholic Patriarchs of Babylon
1662 deaths
Year of birth unknown
17th-century Eastern Catholic archbishops
17th-century people of Safavid Iran